Piazza Tasso may refer to:

 Piazza Tasso, Sorrento, Italy
 Piazza Tasso, Florence, Italy